Mount Judi is Noah's apobaterion or "Place of Descent", the location where the Ark came to rest after the Great Flood, according to very early Christian and Islamic tradition (based on the Quran, 11:44). The Quranic tradition is similar to the Judeo-Christian legend. The identification of Mount Judi as the landing site of the ark persisted in Syriac and Armenian tradition throughout Late Antiquity, but was abandoned for the tradition equating the biblical location with the highest mountain of the region, that is Mount Ararat also in Turkey.

Etymology and geography

The mountainous area that Mount Judi is part of was known as  Qardū in Syriac texts, Gordyene by Greek and Roman writers, and Kordukh in Armenian.

Syriac, Islamic, and early Christian traditions identify Mount Judi or Qardu as a peak near or northeast of the town of Jazirat ibn 'Umar (modern Cizre in south-east Turkey), at the headwaters of the Tigris River, near the modern border with Syria, and that of Iraq. Arab historian Al-Masudi (d. 956), reported that the spot where the ark came to rest could be seen in his time, and that it was located at 80 parasangs (approximately ) from the Tigris. The mountain was historically located in the province of Corduene, south of Lake Van.

The Arabic word al-Jūdiyy, originates from the Syriac word Gudo (ܓܘܕܐ) meaning "Mounds" or "Elevations". The relation of some of the spellings is clear. The origin of Judi is less clear. It is usually interpreted as a corrupted version of the same name, via Al-Gurdi (Reynolds 2004). The proposal that the two names are ultimately the same was first advanced by the English Orientalist George Sale in his translation of the Qur'an published in 1734. Sale's footnote reads:

Sale goes on to say that there was once a famous Christian monastery on the mountain, but that this was destroyed by lightning in the year 776 A.D., following which:

The Arabic name of the mountain, Judi, has also been proposed to be a corruption of the Syriac ܩܪܕܘ Qardō written in Arabic with the Arabic letters waw (و) and raa (ر) being confused in early Islamic manuscripts due to their early resemblance, and then making its way into the Qur’an and Islamic tradition. This is supported by the fact that only in the Syriac Bible is the mountain which Noah’s ark rested on called Qardō, as opposed to Ararat in other Bibles.

A number of sources (including Islamic and Christian) speak of there being at least two settlements near the mountain, one being the ancient ruins of Thamanin (located to the south of the mountain), and the other being the city of Nesbin (near the border with Syria), from where people had come to visit the ark. Thamanin (meaning "Eighty" in Arabic) is thought to have been founded by Noah and the survivors of the flood, who were thought to number around 80, and a tel that was thought to be the ruin of Thamanin is located east of Cizre (one of the places that is thought to have the tomb of Noah).

A Chaldean Archbishop of Babylon, that is Prince Nouri, had travelled from Kochanis in Turkey to Urmiah in Persia. In Urmiah, he met with Dr. Frederick B. Coan, and told him that during the journey, after making three attempts to find the ark, he went to it on the 25th of April, 1887. Accounts collected by Dr. Lee Spencer and Dr. Jean Luc Lienard of the Southwestern Adventist University in the U.S.A., regarding a number of those who claimed to have seen the ark, point to the ark being in south-eastern Turkey, in a mountainous region with swamps, lakes and oil fields, south of Lake Van and west of Lake Urmia.

Religious traditions

Christianity

The Assyrians of the eastern part of the Tigris River had a legend of the ark resting on the Djûdi mountain in the land of Kard. This legend may in origin have been independent of the Genesis' account of Noah's flood, rooted in the more general Near Eastern flood legends, but following Christianization of the Syrians, from about the second century A.D., it became associated with the Mountains of Ararat where Noah landed according to Genesis, and from Syria also, this legend also spread to the Armenians. The Armenians did not traditionally associate Noah's landing site with Mount Ararat, known natively as Masis, but until the 11th century continued to associate Noah's ark with Mount Judi.

The biblical Ararat is thought be a variation of Urartu, an ancient term for the region north of ancient Assyria, which encompasses the Armenian plateau. The "mountains of Ararat" in Genesis have become identified in later (medieval) Christian tradition with the peak now known as Mount Ararat itself, a volcanic massif in Turkey and known in Turkish as "Agri Dagh" (Ağrı Dağı).

Islam

According to the Qur'an (11:44), the final resting place of the vessel was called "Judi", without the word "mountain".

The ninth century Arab geographer Ibn Khordadbeh identified the location of mount Judi as being in the land of Kurds (Al-Akrad), and the Abbasid historian Al-Mas'udi (c. 896–956) recorded that the spot where it came to rest could be seen in his time. Al-Mas'udi also said that the Ark began its voyage at Kufa in central Iraq, and sailed to Mecca, where it circled the Kaaba, before finally travelling to Judi. Yaqut al-Hamawi, also known as Al-Rumi, placed the mountain "above Jazirat ibn Umar, to the east of the Tigris," and mentioned a mosque built by Noah that could be seen in his day, and the traveller Ibn Battuta passed by the mountain in the 14th century.

See also
 İlandağ of the Lesser Caucasus in Nakhchivan, Azerbaijan
 List of volcanoes in Turkey
 Mount Ararat
 Ararat anomaly
 Mount Tendürek
 The Durupınar site
 Karaca Dağ near Diyarbakır
 List of mountains in Turkey
 Mount Cilo
 Mount Uludoruk
 Searches for Noah's Ark
 The Sinjar Mountains in Nineveh Governorate, Iraq

References

External links
 Mt. Cudi on NoahsArkSearch.Com
 Research concerning Mount Judi including some English articles
 Ark search
 Discovering the Lost City of Thamanin
 Bill Crouse: "Noah's ark's final berth is Cudi"

Geography of Şırnak Province
Mountains of the Armenian Highlands
Judi
Noah's Ark
Judi
Taurus Mountains
Zagros Mountains